The New Zealand String Quartet (established 1987) is New Zealand's only full-time string quartet.  The current formation of musicians consists of Helene Pohl (1st violin), Monique Lapins (2nd violin), Gillian Ansell (viola) and Rolf Gjelsten (cello). Former members include Wilma Smith (1st violin, 1987–1993), Josephine Costantino (cello, 1987–1993) and Douglas Beilman (2nd violin, 1989–2015).

The NZSQ performs more than eighty concerts a year in New Zealand and international locations. Performances include international festivals such as the Festival of the Sound, Parry Sound, Ontario, Music Mountain Summer Chamber Music Festival in Lakeville, Connecticut and the Australian Festival of Chamber Music in Townsville, Queensland.  The New Zealand String Quartet are resident artists at the biennial Adam Chamber Music Festival in Nelson, New Zealand, and have been the quartet-in-residence at Te Kōkī New Zealand School of Music at Victoria University of Wellington, since 1991.

The Quartet's discography includes a 3-CD series of Mendelssohn's string quartets for Naxos Records. Other recordings on Naxos include a CD featuring chamber works by Douglas Lilburn and a three-CD Brahms set for Naxos. Other CDs have included works by a number of New Zealand composers and the complete string quartets of Béla Bartók for Atoll Records.

The quartet has also been recorded by CBC in Canada, ABC in Australia, Deutsche Welle (Germany) and Radio New Zealand.

References

External links
New Zealand School of Music
New Zealand String Quartet Official Site

New Zealand classical music groups
String quartets
Musical groups established in 1987